Nationality words link to articles with information on the nation's poetry or literature (for instance, Irish or France).

Events
 Matthew Prior, English poet, enters Parliament.

Works published

Great Britain
 Mary Chudleigh The Ladies Defence; or, The Bride-woman's Counsellor Answer'd
 Daniel Defoe, The True-born Englishman: A satyr, published anonymously this year, but dated "1700"; inspired by John Tutchin's The Foreigners (1700), and answered by Tuchin (anonymously) in his The Apostates, this year; Defoe's poem also resulted in many other responses, adaptations and attacks
 John Dennis, Advancement and Reformation of Modern Poetry (criticism)
 John Dryden, Poems on Various Occasions; and Translations from Several Authors (posthumous)
 Charles Gildon, A New Miscellany of Original Poems (anthology), includes "The Spleen" and other poems by Anne Finch, countess of Winchilsea
 Cotton Mather, Consolations, English, Colonial America (Massachusetts)
 John Philips:
 The Splendid Shilling
 The Sylvan Dream; or, The Mourning Muses, published anonymously, usually attributed to Philips
 John Wilmot, Earl of Rochester, Poems on Several Occasions. By the R. H. the E. of R., London: Printed for A. T.

Other
 Nicolas Boileau-Despréaux, l'Œuvres diverses ("Diverse Works"), France

Births
Death years link to the corresponding "[year] in poetry" article:
 Matthew Concanen (died 1749), Irish-born English poet and writer
 Matthew Pilkington (died 1774), Irish art historian and satirist
 James Sterling (died 1763), English Colonial American poet

Deaths
Birth years link to the corresponding "[year] in poetry" article:
 February – Miguel de Barrios (born 1625), Spanish poet and historian
 March 15 – Jean Renaud de Segrais (born 1624), French poet and novelist
 August 20 – Sir Charles Sedley (born 1639), English wit, dramatist, poet and statesman
 August 24 – Ahasverus Fritsch (born 1629), German poet and legal writer
 August 31 – Samuel Chappuzeau (born 1625), French scholar, author, poet and playwright
 Shah Inayatullah (born 1613), poet from Sindh, Pakistan

See also

 Poetry
 List of years in poetry
 18th century in poetry
 18th century in literature

Notes

18th-century poetry
Poetry